Hoima–Kaiso–Tonya Road is a road in the Western Region of Uganda, connecting the city of Hoima with the towns of Kaiso and Tonya on the shores of Lake Albert in the oil-rich Albertine Graben.

Location
The road passes through the village of Kabaale, in Buseruka County, the location of the Uganda Oil Refinery. The coordinates of the road near Tonya are 1°35'06.0"N; 31°04'59.0"E (Latitude:1.585000; Longitude:31.083056).

Upgrading to tarmac
The upgrading of the road involved the conversion of the existing gravel surface to tarmac and the building of bridges and drainages.

Kolin Insaat Turim Sayani Ve Tecaret, a Turkish construction firm, won the tender to build the road at an estimated cost of USh:320 billion (US$125 million). The construction was fully funded by the government of Uganda. The construction contracts were signed in August 2011.

Construction began in June 2012 and was completed in December 2014.

See also
 Hoima District
 Economy of Uganda
 Uganda–Kenya Crude Oil Pipeline
 List of cities and towns in Uganda
 List of roads in Uganda

References

External links
 Western region takes lion’s share of roads money
 Uganda National Road Authority Homepage
  Oil Sparks Roads Upgrade

Roads in Uganda
Western Region, Uganda
Hoima District
Petroleum infrastructure in Uganda